Lloyd George Knew My Father (or My Father Knew Lloyd George) may refer to:
"Lloyd George Knew My Father" (song), an English schoolboy song
Lloyd George Knew My Father (play), a 1972 play by William Douglas-Home
My Father Knew Lloyd George (TV programme), a 1965 British one-off television show

See also
Lloyd George
"Onward, Christian Soldiers", the name of the tune for the schoolboy song